is  the Head coach of the Kagawa Five Arrows in the Japanese B.League.

Head coaching record

|- 
| style="text-align:left;"|Toyama Grouses
| style="text-align:left;"|2010-11
| 26||8||18||||Fired |||-||-||-||
| style="text-align:center;"|-

|- 
| style="text-align:left;"|Niigata Albirex BB Rabbits
| style="text-align:left;"|2013-14
| 33||11||22||||8th |||-||-||-||
| style="text-align:center;"|-
|-
| style="text-align:left;"|Niigata Albirex BB Rabbits
| style="text-align:left;"|2014-15
| 30||5||25||||9th |||-||-||-|| 
| style="text-align:center;"|-
|- 
| style="text-align:left;"|Bambitious Nara
| style="text-align:left;"|2015-16
| 52||17||35||||9th in Western |||-||-||-|| 
| style="text-align:center;"|-
|- 
| style="text-align:left;"|Bambitious Nara
| style="text-align:left;"|2016-17
| 60||24||36||||5th in B2 Central|||-||-||-||
| style="text-align:center;"|- 
|- 
| style="text-align:left;"|Kagawa Five Arrows
| style="text-align:left;"|2017-18
| 60||22||38||||5th in B2 Western|||-||-||-|| 
| style="text-align:center;"|-
|- 
| style="text-align:left;"|Kagawa Five Arrows
| style="text-align:left;"|2018-19
| 60||19||41||||6th in B2 Western|||-||-||-|| 
| style="text-align:center;"|-
|-

References

1982 births
Living people
Bambitious Nara coaches
Japanese basketball coaches
Kagawa Five Arrows coaches
Saint John Riptide coaches
Toyama Grouses coaches
Kanazawa University alumni